Calamopleurus is an extinct genus of bowfins, comprising three species: C. cylindricus and C. mawsoni from Brazil and C. africanus from Africa.

References

Amiiformes
Prehistoric fish of Africa
Prehistoric fish of South America
Cretaceous animals of South America
Cretaceous Brazil
Fossils of Brazil
Crato Formation
Romualdo Formation
Fossil taxa described in 1841
Taxa named by Louis Agassiz